State Route 124 (SR 124) is a  state highway that runs southwest-to-northeast through portions of DeKalb, Gwinnett, Barrow, and Jackson counties in the north-central part of the U.S. state of Georgia.

Route description
SR 124 begins at an intersection with I-20/US 278/SR 12 in Lithonia, in DeKalb County. To the northeast, it crosses into Gwinnett County and, immediately, crosses over the Yellow River. Southwest of Snellville, it meets SR 264. Through Snellville north to Lawrenceville, the road is known as Scenic Highway. In town, it intersects US 78/SR 10 and then, the Ronald Reagan Parkway; the Eastside Medical Center, Snellville's largest employer, is located on this portion of the route. On the southwestern edge of Lawrenceville is Sugarloaf Parkway. Farther into town, it intersects SR 20. Then, US 29/SR 8 join the road in a concurrency to the west. A short distance later, SR 124 splits to the north, and almost immediately, joins SR 20 concurrently to an interchange with SR 316 (University Parkway). A short distance later, SR 124 splits off to the northeast. From here until SR 211(Old Winder Highway, also about where Braselton Town Limits begin), the road name is changed to Braselton Highway. Northwest of Dacula, it meets SR 324, passes by Mill Creek High School a couple miles later, and crosses into Barrow County shortly thereafter. After an intersection with SR 211, it enters Jackson County. A few miles later is Braselton. There, it meets SR 53. Between SR 211 and SR 53, the signed direction of the highway changes from north to east (and west to south in the opposite direction) It curves to the southeast to SR 332. The road heads westerly until it meets its northeastern terminus, an intersection with SR 11 in the southwestern part of Jefferson.

SR 124 from SR 324 to its eastern terminus at SR 11 runs parallel to, but does not have an interchange with, Interstate 85. However, travelers can access I-85 from SR 124 via SR 324, Hamilton Mill Parkway, SR 211, and SR 53.

Major intersections

See also

References

External links

 
 Georgia Roads (Routes 121 - 140)

124
Transportation in DeKalb County, Georgia
Transportation in Gwinnett County, Georgia
Transportation in Barrow County, Georgia
Transportation in Jackson County, Georgia